Chelmsford 123 is a British television situation comedy produced for Channel 4 by Hat Trick Productions. Chelmsford ran for two series, of six and seven episodes respectively, in 1988 and 1990.

The series was set in the British town of Chelmsford in the year AD 123 and concerned the power struggle between Roman governor Aulus Paulinus (Jimmy Mulville) and the British chieftain, Badvoc (Rory McGrath). Britain is a miserable place, cold and wet – just the place to exile Aulus for accidentally insulting the Emperor's horse but also give him something useful to do. Aulus, probably a play on Aulus Platorius Nepos, the governor of Roman Britain between 122 and 125, was a rather delicate Roman and was usually outwitted by the scheming Badvoc, who hadn't had a haircut for twenty-five years. Many of the other regular "Hat Trick" actors, previously seen in shows such as Who Dares Wins, appeared.

Both series are available on All 4.
Series 1 and 2 were released on DVD by Acorn Media UK on 15 September 2011.

Principal cast
 Rory McGrath as Badvoc, A British chieftain
 Jimmy Mulville as Aulus Paulinus, the Roman Governor of Britain
 Philip Pope as Grasientus, Aulus' Brother in-law. (Pope also wrote the series' title music.)
 Howard Lew Lewis as Blag
 Neil Pearson as Mungo
 Erika Hoffman as Gargamadua, Badvoc's girlfriend (Series 1 only)
 Robert Austin as Functio (Series 1 only)
 Geoffrey McGivern as Wolfbane (one episode in Series 1, regular cast member in Series 2)

Also appearing in a number of episodes were:
 Geoffrey Whitehead as Viatorus, engineer, bringer of rain, sculptor (3 episodes)
 Andy Hamilton as Taranis, British "warrior" (2 episodes) (also sometime programme associate).
 Chris Langham as The Gate Guard and later Chief Of Security (2 episodes)
 Bill Wallis as Emperor Hadrian (2 episodes).

Episode list

Series 1: 1988
 Arrivederci Roma—9 March 1988 (sections in Rome played entirely in Latin, until Aulus arrives in Britain)
 What's Your Poison?—16 March 1988
 The Girl of My Dreams—23 March 1988
 One For The Road—30 March 1988
 Vidi Vici Veni—6 April 1988
 Peeled Grapes and Pedicures—13 April 1988

Series 2: 1990
 Heads You Lose—9 January 1990
 Get Well Soon—16 January 1990
 Bird Trouble—23 January 1990
 Odi, et Amo—30 January 1990
 The Secret War—6 February 1990
 Mine's a Double—13 February 1990
 Something Beginning With 'E' —20 February 1990 (as with first episode, sections in Rome played entirely in Latin, until the Emperor arrives in Britain)

References

External links
 
 
 

Channel 4 sitcoms
Fiction set in Roman Britain
1988 British television series debuts
1990 British television series endings
1980s British sitcoms
1990s British sitcoms
Television series by Hat Trick Productions
Television series set in the Roman Empire
Latin-language television